Mr. Mister was an American rock band from Phoenix, Arizona, active from 1982 until 1990. The band consisted of Richard Page on lead vocals and bass guitar, Steve George on keyboards/backing vocals, Pat Mastelotto on acoustic and electronic drums/percussion and Steve Farris on guitars/backing vocals. Mr. Mister was the successor to the band Pages, fronted by Page and George from 1978 to 1981.

Early work
Although formed in Phoenix, Arizona, United States, Mr. Mister was based in Los Angeles, California. Richard Page had previously worked as a session musician (for Quincy Jones) and had composed for Michael Jackson, Rick Springfield, Donna Summer, Kenny Loggins, Al Jarreau, and many more.

In 1978, Page and his childhood friend Steve George founded the band Pages in Phoenix, Arizona. Pages explored a pop fusion sound, with a changing lineup of session musicians. Although Pages had a minor hit single with "I Do Believe in You", and its three albums garnered favorable reviews, the group had little commercial success. After disbanding Pages in 1981, Page and George focused on songwriting and studio session work for pop artists ranging from Laura Branigan to Village People.

By 1982, Page and George began putting together a more pop-oriented group with a permanent lineup, rounded out by drummer Pat Mastelotto and guitarist Steve Farris. All four members had done extensive session work for other artists and brought numerous influences to the band. The initial plan was to bring in a fifth member, a bass guitarist, but after realizing that Page, who was originally slated to be solely the lead singer, could also play bass, the members decided to remain a four-piece.

Mainstream success
When the first Mr. Mister album, I Wear the Face, was released by RCA Records in 1984, Page was offered the chance to replace Bobby Kimball as lead singer of Toto, and later was offered Peter Cetera's place in Chicago; he refused both offers.

Their second album, 1985's Welcome to the Real World—with lyrics from Page's cousin John Lang—was the breakthrough for Mr. Mister. All three singles were in the top 10, two of which hit No. 1 on the U.S. pop charts—"Kyrie" and "Broken Wings". The latter was inspired by the book of the same title by Khalil Gibran. They had several No. 1 MTV videos, and performed at the first MTV Spring Break show in 1986. That year, Mr. Mister had two Grammy Award nominations, including Best Pop Band (which was awarded to the "We Are the World" ensemble, USA for Africa).

During this time, Mr. Mister toured with other popular acts including Don Henley, The Bangles, Eurythmics, Tina Turner, Heart, and Adam Ant. The band's third album was Go On..., which was not a commercial success.

During the 1980s, the group wrote and/or performed songs for several movies, including the title song for Stand and Deliver, and "Is It Love" as the outro track for Stakeout. "Don't Slow Down" appeared in A Fine Mess. The band also made concert appearances with the pop rock band the Bangles.

Guitarist Steve Farris left in 1988.  The remaining band members teamed up with Christian recording artist Paul Clark and acted as his backup band for Clark's 1988 indie release Awakening from the Western Dream. Next, the band began working on a fourth album, Pull, with session guitarists Buzz Feiten, Trevor Rabin, Doug Macaskill and Peter McRea.  The album was completed in 1990, but RCA Records decided not to release it.  Soon afterwards, the band broke up.  The album remained unreleased for 20 years, although one track ("Waiting in My Dreams") appeared on a 2001 greatest hits collection by the band. On November 23, 2010, the remastered album was finally released by the band, in collaboration with Sony Music, on Richard Page's independent label, Little Dume Recordings.

Long after their dissolution, the band was referred to in the song "Hey, Soul Sister" by Train, with the line "Ain't that Mr. Mister on the radio, stereo?"

Band members
 Richard Page – lead vocals, bass (1982–1990), guitar (1988–1990)
 Steve George – keyboards, saxophone, backing vocals (1982–1990)
 Pat Mastelotto – drums, percussion (1982–1990)
 Steve Farris – guitar, backing vocals (1982–1988)

Discography

Studio albums
 I Wear the Face (1984)
 Welcome to the Real World (1985)
 Go On... (1987)
 Pull (2010)

Awards and nominations

References

External links
 
 Richard Page official website
 Pat Mastelotto official website
 Steve Farris official website

1982 establishments in Arizona
American new wave musical groups
American pop rock music groups
Musical groups established in 1982
Musical groups disestablished in 1990
Musical groups from California
Musical groups from Phoenix, Arizona
RCA Records artists